Frederik Willem Grosheide (25 November 1881 – 5 March 1972) was a Dutch New Testament scholar. He served as Professor of New Testament at the Vrije Universiteit Amsterdam.

Grosheide wrote the original commentary on 1 Corinthians in the New International Commentary on the New Testament series. He also wrote a number of commentaries in the Korte Verklaring series: Acts, First and Second Corinthians, Hebrews, and the epistles of James and Jude. George Harink suggests that, along with G. Ch. Aalders, Seakle Greijdanus, and Jan Ridderbos, Grosheide "took the lead in Neo-Calvinist exegetical production."

In 1951, a Festschrift was published in honour of his 70th birthday: Arcana revelata: Een bundel Nieuw-Testamentische studiën aangeboden aan Prof. Dr. F. W. Grosheide ter gelegenheid van zijn zeventigste verjaardag.

Grosheide was also chairman of the Bible Society of the Netherlands.

Works

References

External links
 

1881 births
1972 deaths
Dutch biblical scholars
New Testament scholars
Bible commentators
Academic staff of Vrije Universiteit Amsterdam